1st Military Region of Vietnam People's Army, is directly under the Ministry of Defence of Vietnam, tasked to organise, build, manage and commander fights against foreign invaders to protect the North East of Vietnam. The north-east region of Vietnam, borders with the Guangxi of China. In 1979, Chinese army with 5 infantry corps, 17 infantry divisions, launched a huge invasion in this military zone, occupied the Lạng Sơn and Cao Bằng.  The headquarters of the 1st Military Zone is in Thái Nguyên.
 Commander: Lt. Gen. Nguyễn Hồng Thái 
 Political Commissar: Lt. Gen. Dương Đình Thông
 Deputy Commander cum Chief of Staff Commander: Maj. Gen. Nguyễn Huy Cảnh

Agencies
× Headquarters of Staff 
 Logistics Department 
 Technic Department 
 Office of Command  
 Department of Politics  
 branch of cadre 
 branch of Organisation  
 Branch of Propaganda and Training 
 Branch of Thought and Culture 
 Branch of Policy
 Military Court of Military Zone
 Military Procuracy of Military Zone 
 Inspection Commission of the Party

Structure 
× Military Command of Cao Bằng Province
 Military Command of Bắc Kạn Province
 Military Command of Lạng Sơn Province
 Military Command of Bắc Giang Province-
 Commander: Major General Hà Ngọc Hoa 
 Military Command of Thái Nguyên Province
 Military Command of Bắc Ninh Province 
 Military School of Military Zone
 3rd Division
 346th Division
 799th Economic Construction Division ("national economic team"?) (Bảo Lâm District, Cao Bằng)

Successive Commander and Leadership

Commander

Major General (1974), Lieutenant General(1980), Colonel General (1984) Đàm Quang Trung (7/1976-1986):
 Lieutenant General Đàm Văn Ngụy (1987-)
 Lieutenant General Phùng Quang Thanh (1997-2001)
 Lieutenant General Nguyễn Khắc Nghiên (2001-2002)
 Lieutenant General Phạm Xuân Thệ (2002-2007):
 Lieutenant General Nguyễn Văn Đạo (2007-May 2010)
 Lieutenant General Bế Xuân Trường (May 2010 – 2014)
 Lieutenant General Phan Văn Giang (2014-2016)
 Major General Ngô Minh Tiến (2016-2018)
 Lieutenant General Trần Hồng Minh (2018-2019)
 Lieutenant General Nguyễn Hồng Thái (2019-present)

The Commissioner, Deputy Commander of Politics
 Major General (1974) Đàm Quang Trung (7/1976-1980):
 Major General Đàm Đình Trại ( -2004)
 Lieutenant General Vi Văn Mạn (2004-2011)
 Lieutenant General Nguyễn Sỹ Thăng (2011-2018)
 Lieutenant General Dương Đình Thông (2018-present)

References

Military regions of the People's Army of Vietnam